Early Autumn may refer to:

 Early Autumn, a 1926 novel by Louis Bromfield
 Early Autumn (Parker novel), a 1980 Spenser detective novel by Robert B. Parker
 "Early Autumn" (song), a 1949 song composed by Ralph Burns and Woody Herman with lyrics by Johnny Mercer
 "Early Autumn," a song composed by Barbara Belle and Stan Rhodes, recorded by Fran Warren (with Claude Thornhill)
 Early Autumn (film), a 1962 Yugoslav film